The Supreme Court of the United States handed down nine per curiam opinions during its 2000 term, which began October 2, 2000 and concluded September 30, 2001.

Because per curiam decisions are issued from the Court as an institution, these opinions all lack the attribution of authorship or joining votes to specific justices. All justices on the Court at the time the decision was handed down are assumed to have participated and concurred unless otherwise noted.

Court membership
Chief Justice: William Rehnquist

Associate Justices: John Paul Stevens, Sandra Day O'Connor, Antonin Scalia, Anthony Kennedy, David Souter, Clarence Thomas, Ruth Bader Ginsburg, Stephen Breyer

Sinkfield v. Kelley

Bush v. Palm Beach County Canvassing Board

Bush v. Gore

Fiore v. White

Ohio v. Reiner

Clark County School Dist. v. Breeden

Major League Baseball Players Assn. v. Garvey

Arkansas v. Sullivan

See also 
 List of United States Supreme Court cases, volume 531
 List of United States Supreme Court cases, volume 532

Notes

References
 

 

United States Supreme Court per curiam opinions
Lists of 2000 term United States Supreme Court opinions
2000 per curiam